University of Guam (U.O.G.) is a public land-grant university in Mangilao, Guam. It is accredited by the Western Association of Schools and Colleges and offers thirty-four degree programs at the undergraduate level and eleven at the master's level. Of the university's 3,387 students, 94% are of Asian-Pacific Islander ethnicity and nearly 72% are full-time (fall 2012 figures). A full-time faculty of about 180 work at the university.

History 
University of Guam was founded in 1952 as a two-year teacher-training school known as the Territorial College of Guam, established by Governor Carlton Skinner In 1960, the college moved to the present campus in the central district of Mangilao. In 1965, the college was accredited as a four-year, degree granting institution. By 1968, enrollment had reached 1,800 students while staff and faculty totaled more than 130. It was designated as a land grant institution by the United States Congress in 1972.

Presidents
 Antonio C. Yamashita (1964–1970)^
 Pedro C. Sanchez (1970–1974)
 Antonio C. Yamashita (1974–1977)^
 Rosa Roberto Carter (1977–1983)
 Jose Q. Cruz (1983–1987)
 Wilfredo P. Leon Guerrero (1988–1993)^
 John C. Salas (1993–1996)
 Jose T. Nededog (1996–2000)
 Harold L. Allen (2001–2008)^
 Robert A. Underwood (2008–2018)^
 Thomas W. Krise (2018–present)

^ Indicates President Emeritus status conferred by UOG Board of Regents

Colleges and schools 

The University of Guam offers bachelor's degrees in thirty-four areas and master's degrees in eleven areas:

College of Liberal Arts and Social Sciences (CLASS)
Division of Humanistic Studies
Department of English and Applied Linguistics (D.E.A.L.)
Division of Social and Behavioral Sciences
Division of Communication and Fine Arts
College of Natural and Applied Sciences (CNAS)
Department of Mathematics and Computer Science
Division of Natural Sciences
Division of Agriculture and Consumer Sciences
Army ROTC
School of Business and Public Administration (SBPA)
Division of Business
Division of Public Administration
School of Education (SOE)
Division of Foundations, Educational Research and Human Studies
Division of Teacher Education and Public Service
School of Engineering
Civil Engineering Program
Pre-Engineering Program
School of Health (SOH)
Health Sciences Program
Nursing Program
Social Work Program

Notable alumni
Joseph Franklin Ada, Former Governor of Guam.
 Katherine B. Aguon - Guamanian educator and politician.
 Carmen Fernandez - Businesswoman, politician, and college administrator.
Peter Sugiyama, member of the Senate of Palau
Judith Won Pat, Speaker of the 30th Guam Legislature.
 Antoinette D. Sanford - Businesswoman and politician.
Ray Tenorio, Lieutenant Governor of Guam.
Anthony "Tony" Ada, Guam Senator, Member of the Legislature of Guam
Tan Siu Lin, Founder of Tan Holdings Corporation and Chairman of the Peking University Luen Thai Center for Supply Chain System R&D.
 Aline A. Yamashita - Guamanian educator and politician. Former Senator in the Guam Legislature.
 Amata Coleman Radewagen - Delegate to Congress, American Samoa.
 Elizabeth Diaz Rechebei, educational leader in the Northern Mariana Islands

Notable faculty
Vicente T. Blaz, professor of law.
Dirk Ballendorf, former Professor of Micronesian studies, Director of the Micronesian Area Research Center (1979-1984, 2004-2007).
Benjamin Clemens Stone, British-American botanist.
Tony Palomo, historian.
Ansito Walter, former Governor of Chuuk State.

References

External links 

 Official website

 
Land-grant universities and colleges
University of Guam
Schools accredited by the Western Association of Schools and Colleges
Educational institutions established in 1952
1952 establishments in Guam
Public universities and colleges in Guam
Census-designated places in Guam